"Dangerous" is a song by Penny Ford that reached the UK Top 50 in 1985.

References

Penny Ford songs
1985 singles
Year of song missing